Fixer or The Fixer may refer to:

In print
 Fixer (comics), two different Marvel Comics characters
 The Fixer, super-hero and protagonist of Frank Miller's Holy Terror (graphic novel)
 The Fixer (comics), journalistic comic on the Bosnian War, by Joe Sacco
 The Fixer (novel), 1966 novel by Bernard Malamud

TV and film
 The Fixer (1915 film), a silent film starring Alma Hanlon
 The Fixer (1968 film), a British film based on the Malamud novel
 The Fixer (1998 film), an American TV film by screenwriter Charles Robert Carner
 Fixer: The Taking of Ajmal Naqshbandi, a 2009 documentary
 The Fixer (2016 film), a drama
 The Fixer, also known as Burn Country, a 2016 drama film
 The Fixer (2008 TV series), a British television drama
 The Fixer (2015 Canadian TV series), a Canadian 4-part-miniseries
 The Fixer (2015 Hong Kong TV series), a Hong Kong television drama
 "Fixer" (Justified), a 2010 episode of Justified
 "The Fixer", an episode of the British sitcom Black Books
 The Fixer, local South African title for the American TV series Scandal
 Alex Polizzi: The Fixer, British business documentary show
 "The Fixer", Frank Tagliano, protagonist of the TV series Lilyhammer
 Fixer, RC-1140, clone trooper of Delta Squad in the Star Wars movies
 Fixer (TV series), a British-Lebanese action comedy television series

Music
 Fixers (band), experimental/psychedelic pop English band
 Mentallo and the Fixer, American electro-industrial band

 "The Fixer", song from [[Smokin' (Humble Pie album)|Smokin''' (Humble Pie album)]], released in 1972
 "Fixxxer", a song from Reload (Metallica album), released 1997
 "The Fixer", song by George Thorogood from 2003 album Ride 'Til I Die Fixer (Download album), 2007
 Fixer (Akina Nakamori album), 2015
 "The Fixer" (song), 2009 single by Pearl Jam from BackspacerOther uses
 Fixer (person), a person who solves problems or fixes things, sometimes in an illicit matter
 Photographic fixer, chemical that stabilizes developed photographs
 Fixer, Kentucky, unincorporated community in Lee County, Kentucky, United States
 Fixer, a character class in Cyberpunk 2020'', a role-playing game
 The Fixers, an independent professional wrestling tag team made up of Jay Bradley and Wrecking Ball Legursky

See also
 
 
 Fix (disambiguation)
 Fixed (disambiguation)
 Fixing (disambiguation)
 Fixx (disambiguation)
 Fix-up (disambiguation)
 Fixer Upper (disambiguation)
 Cleaner (disambiguation)
 Hitman (disambiguation)